African American music
 Acid House
 Bluegrass
 Blues
 Blues Rock
 Bounce Music
 Breakbeat
 Chicago Blues
 Chicago House
 Country
 Deep House
 Delta Blues
 Detroit Blues
 Detroit Techno
 Contemporary R&B
 Disco
 Doo-wop
 Electric Blues
 Electro
 Funk
 Garage
 Go-go
 Gospel music
 Hard Rock
 Heavy Metal
 Hip Hop
 Hip House
 House
 Jazz
 Memphis Blues
 Minimal Techno
 Neo Soul
 New Orleans Blues
 Ragtime
 Rap
 Rhythm & Blues
 Rock
 Rock & Roll
 Rockabilly
 Soul
 Spirituals
 Swing
 Techno
 Texas Blues
 Zydeco

 Arabic music
 Adhan
 Anasheed
 Liwa
 Fann at-Tanbura
 Middle-Eastern & North African
 Mizmar
 Gnawa

 Brazilian music
 Afoxé
 Capoeira
 Maracatu
 Samba
 Samba-Reggae
 Funk Carioca

 British Black music

2 Tone
 2-Step Garage
Afroswing
Blues
Caribbean
Disco
Drum & Bass
Dubstep
Eurodance
Eurodisco
Garage
Grime
Hip Hop
Hip House
Oldschool Jungle
Ragga Jungle
Rhythm & Blues
Soul
Speed Garage

Cape Verdean music (see page for full list of musical forms)
Morna

Colombian music (see page for full list of musical forms)
 Cuban music (see page for full list of musical forms)
 Son

 Music of the Dominican Republic (see page for full list of musical forms)
Bachata
Merengue
 Music of Ecuador
Bambuco
Bomba (Ecuador)

 France
French hip hop
Raï

 Garifuna music
 Music of Belize
 Music of Honduras
 Hunguhungu

 Haitian music (see page for full list of musical forms)
 Jamaica
Dancehall
Dub
Lovers rock
Mento
Ragga
Reggae
Rocksteady
Roots reggae
Ska

 Music of the Lesser Antilles
Zouk
Music of Anguilla
Music of Antigua and Barbuda
Music of Aruba and the Netherlands Antilles
Music of Barbados
Spouge
Music of Grenada
Music of Montserrat
Music of Saint Kitts and Nevis
Music of Saint Vincent and the Grenadines
Music of Trinidad and Tobago
Calypso music
Music of the Virgin Islands

 Music of French Guiana
Kasékò

 Peru
Landó
Festejo
Cueca

 Puerto Rico
 Bomba
 Plena
 Reggaeton

 Uruguay and Argentina
Candombe

 Siddi music
 Dhamal dance

See also
 Music of the African diaspora
 Afro-Caribbean music
 Music of Africa
 Middle Eastern and North African music traditions
 Music of West Africa
 Sub-Saharan African music traditions

musical
African
a